Euphonia is the second studio album by Perceptual Outer Dimensions, released on September 19, 1995 by Fifth Colvmn Records.

Music
Composer Holmes Ives had recorded and released The Journey to Planet POD on Fifth Colvmn Records compilation. The composition "De La Luna" was released for the Fifth Colvmn compilation Forced Cranial Removal.

Reception 
Sonic Boom described Euphonia as an album "nothing short of astounding in its complexity and depth" that "creates an acoustic effect produced by musical patterns combined as to please the ear or euphony."

Track listing

Personnel 
Adapted from the Euphonia liner notes.

Perceptual Outer Dimensions
 Holmes Ives – instruments, production, recording, mixing

Additional performers
 Laura O'Neil – vocals

Production and design
 Tom Baker – mastering
 Zalman Fishman – executive-production
 Phil Merkle – cover art, illustrations, photography
 Tim Steenstra – cover art, illustrations, photography

Release history

References

External links 
 
 Euphonia at Discogs (list of releases)

1995 albums
Perceptual Outer Dimensions albums
Fifth Colvmn Records albums